Doctors and Nurses is a British television sitcom written by Nigel Smith and Dr. Phil Hammond, focusing on the fraught relationship between two orthopaedic surgeons, set in a hospital on the Isle of Wight.

It starred Adrian Edmondson, Mina Anwar and David Mitchell, and aired six episodes on BBC One from 13 January to 17 February 2004. The series was neither a critical nor commercial success, and did not return for a second series. Edmondson did go on to play a similar doctor role in the non-comic hospital drama Holby City.

Phil Hammond appeared as a neurosurgeon in episode three.

Cast
Roy Glover – Adrian Edmondson
George Banatwala – Madhav Sharma
Toby Stephens – David Mitchell
Lucy Potter – Abigail Cruttenden
Zita Khan – Mina Anwar
Walt – Geoffrey McGivern
Tara Cummings – Susan Earl
Flapper – Steven Alvey
Stumpy Yates – Joanna Scanlan

References

External links

 Comedy Guide

BBC television sitcoms
2004 British television series debuts
2004 British television series endings
2000s British sitcoms
Television series by ITV Studios
Carlton Television
English-language television shows
Television shows set in Nottinghamshire